Sandeep Gupta (born 24 November 1989) is an Indian cricketer. He plays as a wicket-keeper for Jharkhand cricket team. He was born in Kota, Rajasthan.

References

External links
 
 

1989 births
Indian cricketers
Jharkhand cricketers
People from Kota, Rajasthan
Living people